No Tengo Dinero may refer to:

 "No Tengo Dinero" (Juan Gabriel song), 1971
 "No Tengo Dinero" (Righeira song), 1983
 "No Tengo Dinero" (Los Umbrellos song), 1997